Time's Champion is a work of Doctor Who fan fiction, written by Chris McKeon on the basis of an original novel outline by Craig Hinton, and incorporating fragments of text written by Hinton before his death.  It features the Sixth Doctor, Melanie Bush and Sergeant Benton, and is an exploration both of the origins of the Valeyard and the concept of the Doctor's role as "Time's Champion" in the Virgin New Adventures. It also features plot elements from Hinton's earlier book The Quantum Archangel.

It was published in paperback form in 2008, as a charity venture in aid of the British Heart Foundation.  The BBC, who hold the copyright in Doctor Who and had rejected Hinton's original proposal in 2004, were not involved.

Plot
2008: John Benton is celebrating his birthday by having a few friends round to his house at Hilsley Halt. But the monsters are lurking.

1908: Writer George Mackenzie-Trench is suffering from writer's block unable to foresee the ending of his novel, Time’s Champion, nor the consequences of its completion.

9908: The planet Caliban is under attack from Cyber-forces, and governor George Mackenzie-Trench intends to save their world by unleashing Abaddon, a powerful computer virus. But Abaddon has other instructions.

Meanwhile, Gallifrey is under attack and the Keeper is seeking answers within the Matrix. President Romana is helpless: no-one is who they seem and the conspiracy goes even deeper than she can imagine. She needs the Doctor...

But the Doctor is on Earth in 2008, fighting to save the life of a child who must survive at all costs.

As Gallifrey is attacked by ghosts from the past, the Doctor, Mel and Benton find themselves in the middle of an epic and final battle as the ancient gods choose their Champions and allow chaos to reign across all of time and space.

Continuity
 Although Mel and Sgt. Benton are the chief companions for the novel, many others are mentioned or have brief cameos, including: The Brigadier, Sarah Jane Smith, Jo Grant, Romana, Leela, Mike Yates, Susan, Ace, Adric, Katarina and Kamelion. 
 Co-ordinator Vansell appears in The Sirens of Time, The Apocalypse Element, Neverland and He Jests at Scars....
 This book offers a different explanation for the Sixth Doctor's regeneration from both the televised series of events in Time and the Rani, the audio drama The Sixth Doctor: The Last Adventure and the Missing Adventures novel Spiral Scratch. It is explained that the events of Spiral Scratch were an alternate reality experienced by Mel.
 The Valeyard appears as the Keeper, which sets the events of this novel some fifty years after The Trial of a Time Lord.

Authorship
The book is credited to "Craig Hinton & Chris McKeon".  Speaking in the podcast DWO WhoCast Episode 84, McKeon said:

Audio adaptation
In 2015, work began on an audio adaptation featuring John Levene reprising his role as Sergeant Benton. The project remained dormant for several years until August 2021, where the fan audio drama group Black Glove Studios teased an interest in furthering the idea on twitter

Notes

External links
Official Time's Champion Blog
The novel's missing epilogue

Reviews
Doctor Who Reviews Guide on Time's Champion
Total Sci Fi review of Time's Champion
Sci-Fi Online review of Time's Champion

2008 British novels
2008 science fiction novels
Fan fiction works
Sixth Doctor novels
The Master (Doctor Who) novels